Plaska is an incorporated place in Hall County, Texas, United States. The population was 20 in 2009.

References

Populated places in Hall County, Texas